The 2020–21 FIS Ski Jumping World Cup was the 42nd World Cup season in ski jumping for men, the 24th official World Cup season in ski flying, and the 10th World Cup season for women. The men's season started in November in Wisła and ended in March in Planica. The women's season started in December in Ramsau and ended in Chaykovsky.

Map of world cup hosts 
All 19 locations hosting world cup events for men (15), for women (7) and shared (3) in this season.

 Planica 7
 Willingen Six
 Four Hills Tournament
 Women only

Calendar

Men 
World Cup history in real time

after FH event in Planica  (28 March 2021)

Women 
World Cup history in real time

after LH event in Chaykovsky (28 March 2021)

Men's team 
World Cup history in real time

after FH event in Planica (28 March 2021)

Women's team 
World Cup history in real time

after NH event in Chaykovsky (28 March 2021)

Mixed team 
World Cup history in real time

after NH event in Râșnov (20 February 2021)

Men's standings

Overall

Nations Cup

Prize money

Ski Flying

Four Hills Tournament

Willingen Six

Planica7

Women's standings

Overall

Nations Cup

Prize money

Russia Tour Blue Bird

Points distribution 
The table shows the number of points won in the 2020–21 FIS Ski Jumping World Cup for men and women.

Qualifications

Men

Women

Achievements 
First World Cup career victory

Men
 Halvor Egner Granerud (24), in his sixth season – the WC 3 in Ruka

Women
 Eirin Maria Kvandal (19), in her first season – the WC 2 in Ljubno
 Nika Križnar (20), in her sixth season – the WC 5 in Hinzenbach

First World Cup podium

Men
 Halvor Egner Granerud (24), in his sixth season – the WC 3 in Ruka
 Bor Pavlovčič (23), in his fifth season – the WC 18 in Klingenthal
 Andrzej Stękała (25), in his fourth season – the WC 20 in Zakopane

Women
 Eirin Maria Kvandal (19), in her first season – the WC 2 in Ljubno

Number of wins this season (in brackets are all-time wins)

Men
 Halvor Egner Granerud – 11 (11)
 Kamil Stoch – 3 (39) 
 Ryōyū Kobayashi – 3 (19)
 Karl Geiger – 3 (9)
 Markus Eisenbichler – 2 (3)
 Dawid Kubacki – 1 (5)
 Marius Lindvik – 1 (3)
 Robert Johansson – 1 (3)

Women
 Marita Kramer – 7 (8)
 Sara Takanashi – 3 (60)
 Nika Križnar – 2 (2)
 Eirin Maria Kvandal – 1 (1)

Retirements 
The following notable ski jumpers retired during or after the 2020–21 season:

Men
 Paul Brasme
 Jernej Damjan
 Tim Fuchs
 Tjaš Grilc
 Rok Justin
 Choi Seou
 Gregor Schlierenzauer
 Vojtěch Štursa
 Dmitriy Vassiliev
 Paul Winter

Women
 Sarah Hendrickson
 Léa Lemare

Notes

References 

FIS Ski Jumping World Cup
World cup
World cup